Orthosia is a genus of plants in the family Apocynaceae, first described as a genus in 1844.

Species

formerly included

References

Asclepiadoideae
Apocynaceae genera
Taxa named by Joseph Decaisne